Mladen Pantić (born July 31, 1982) is a Serbian professional basketball player for Čačak 94 of the Second Basketball League of Serbia.

Professional career
He grew up with Železnik (Yugoslavia) juniors, he has been a member of the Yugoslav Junior National Team, played at 2002 European Under-20 Championship, Pantić was also a member of the team that represented Serbia & Montenegro at the 2003 Summer Universiade in Daegu, finishing as the gold medal winners.

He won the 2005 and 2007 Serbian National Cup with FMP Železnik, won the 2006 Goodyear League with Železnik, won the gold medal at the 2003 Summer Universiade. Won the 2008 Basketball Bundesliga with Alba Berlin.

On 9 March 2017, he signed for Macedonian club Feni Industries. On 2 October 2020, Pantić signed for Pirot of the Second Basketball League of Serbia. In August 2021, Pantić signed for Čačak 94.

References

External links
 Mladen Pantić at euroleague.net
 Mladen Pantić at eurobasket.com
 Mladen Pantić at fiba.com

1982 births
Living people
ABA League players
Alba Berlin players
Basketball League of Serbia players
Basketball players from Belgrade
BC Dnipro players
BC Levski Sofia players
Centers (basketball)
CSM Oradea (basketball) players
Ikaros B.C. players
Kavala B.C. players
Keravnos B.C. players
KK Borac Čačak players
KK Bratunac players
KK Čačak 94 players
KK FMP (1991–2011) players
KK Hemofarm players
KK Igokea players
KK Lavovi 063 players
KK Mega Basket players
KK Mornar Bar players
KK Pirot players
KK Radnički Kragujevac (2009–2014) players
KK Zlatibor players
Kolossos Rodou B.C. players
SCM U Craiova (basketball) players
Serbian expatriate basketball people in Bulgaria
Serbian expatriate basketball people in Bosnia and Herzegovina
Serbian expatriate basketball people in Cyprus
Serbian expatriate basketball people in Germany
Serbian expatriate basketball people in Greece
Serbian expatriate basketball people in North Macedonia
Serbian expatriate basketball people in Romania
Serbian expatriate basketball people in Ukraine
Serbian men's basketball players
Universiade gold medalists for Serbia and Montenegro
Universiade medalists in basketball
Medalists at the 2003 Summer Universiade